"Something Beautiful" is a song co-written by English musicians Guy Chambers and Robbie Williams. Originally offered to Welsh singer Tom Jones, it was released as the third single from Williams' fifth studio album, Escapology (2002). The track was issued in Europe on 7 July 2003 and in the United Kingdom three weeks later, on 28 July. "Something Beautiful" reached number three on the UK Singles Chart and peaked within the top 10 in Denmark, Ireland, the Netherlands, New Zealand, and Romania.

Music video
The video of the song is influenced by reality shows like Pop Idol, and is one of the few with two different endings. An interactive version of the video was created to run on Sky Digital by weapon7 where viewers could vote through the red button and discover the backstory of the participants. A spokesman for Robbie Williams told the Daily Mirror, "We wanted to find someone with the 'essence' of Robbie to perform the new track in the video – it could be a woman."

At the start of the video, fans from all over Europe try to impress judges during the audition stage of fictional reality show Manufactured Miracles; one of the members on the selection panel is Williams' real-life father Pete Conway. Several contestants are put through to the next round, but only three emerge finalists: actor/singer Peter Caruana from Manchester, and students Rebecca Durrant and Bjorn Wenner from Essex and Hamburg respectively. They are groomed by a choreographer and singing coach, and given makeovers by stylists whilst experiencing the celebrity status lifestyle, with an interview at Capital FM and a stay at a luxury hotel before competing in the live shows, each finalist representing a different stage in Williams' career.

Two endings were filmed. In the first, viewers are asked to vote on Williams' website for whom they thought was the best performer. The second version of the video ends with Peter winning the competition before meeting Williams at a bus stop, the latter reading a newspaper with the headline "Robbie For a Week: Back to Reality for Final Three"—a reference to reality stars abandoned by once-loyal fans and management following brief success. As Peter was unaware he would meet Williams, his surprise was genuine.

Rebecca Durrant, who later became a police officer, told the Sunday Mirror the experience put her off fame stating "After I filmed the video I realised I didn't want to face the pressure, the secrecy, the non-stop filming and constant hair and make-up touchups... the closest I get to singing now is karaoke in my local pub." Similarly, in an interview with the Salford Advertiser, Peter Caruana stated, "I decided it was time to give Robbie a rest – he's been good to me, but enough is enough. In a way I think it has held me back and I really want to get back to treading the boards, because that's what I trained for." He has since featured in commercials for Chicago Town Pizza as a Simon Cowell lookalike.

Track listings

UK and Australasian CD single
 "Something Beautiful" – 4:48
 "Berliner Star" – 3:52
 "Coffee, Tea & Sympathy" – 4:35
 Photo gallery

UK and Australian DVD single
 "Something Beautiful" (interactive video)
 "Berliner Star" (audio) – 3:52
 "Coffee, Tea & Sympathy" (audio) – 4:35
 Robbie video clip

UK cassette single
 "Something Beautiful" – 4:48
 "Berliner Star" – 3:52
 "Coffee, Tea & Sympathy" – 4:35

European CD single
 "Something Beautiful" – 4:48
 "Berliner Star" – 3:54

Japanese CD single
 "Something Beautiful (サムシング・ビューティフル)" (album version)
 "Cursed (カーズド)" – 3:52 (album version)
 "Feel" (video clips)

Credits and personnel
Credits are taken from the Escapology album booklet.

Recording
 Recorded in Los Angeles and London
 Mixed at The Record Plant (Los Angeles)
 Mastered at Marcussen Mastering (Los Angeles)

Personnel

 Robbie Williams – writing, lead vocals
 Guy Chambers – writing, piano, Wurlitzer, Hammond organ, production, arrangement
 Katie Kissoon – backing vocals
 Tessa Niles – backing vocals
 Gary Nuttall – backing vocals, electric guitars
 Claire Worrall – backing vocals
 Paul Williams – backing vocals
 Neil Taylor – electric guitars
 Yolanda Charles – bass guitars
 Phil Spalding – bass guitars
 Andy Wallace – Hammond organ
 Jeremy Stacey – drums
 Luís Jardim – percussion
 Dave Bishop – brass
 Simon Gardner – brass
 Neil Sidwell – brass
 Steve Sidwell – brass
 London Session Orchestra – orchestra
 Gavyn Wright – concertmaster
 Nick Ingman – orchestral arrangement
 Steve Price – orchestral engineering
 Tom Jenkins – assistant orchestral engineering
 Isobel Griffiths – orchestral contracting
 Jim Brumby – programming, additional engineering
 Steve Power – production, mixing
 J.D. Andrew – assistant mixing
 Richard Flack – engineering, programming
 Steve Marcussen – mastering

Charts

Weekly charts

Year-end charts

Release history

References

External links
 The Page of Sky Interactive about the project
 Manufactured Miracles

2002 songs
2003 singles
British soul songs
Chrysalis Records singles
Number-one singles in Scotland
Robbie Williams songs
Song recordings produced by Guy Chambers
Song recordings produced by Steve Power
Songs written by Guy Chambers
Songs written by Robbie Williams